The CPBL–KBO Club Championship 2010 was contested between the champions of Chinese Professional Baseball League's Taiwan Series, and the Korea Baseball Organization's Korean Series on Saturday, 4–5 November 2010. The game was played at the Taichung Intercontinental Baseball Stadium. The two-game title ended in a draw.

Game summary

Game 1 (2010)

Game 2 (2010)

References

CPBL–KBO Club Championship
Asia Series
Baseball competitions in Taiwan
2010 in Taiwanese sport

ja:韓国・台湾クラブチャンピオンシップ
zh:中韓冠軍賽